George Robert Shepherd, 1st Baron Shepherd PC (19 August 1881 – 4 December 1954), was a British Labour politician.

Early life
Shepherd was the son of George Robert Shepherd, a tailor of Spalding, Lincolnshire.  Shepherd began working as an assistant to a cobbler in Bradford, joining a union and, in 1903, also joining the Independent Labour Party (ILP).  From 1908, he spent a year working as the full-time ILP organiser for the Midlands, and was then appointed as an agent for the Labour Party in Dundee, where he was election agent for Alexander Wilkie.  In 1913, he moved to Blackburn, to serve as agent for Philip Snowden.

He did not serve in the First World War, being a conscientious objector.

Career
In 1920, Shepherd became Labour Party District Organiser for the London and Southern area. He served as Assistant National Agent for from 1924 to 1929 and National Agent from 1929 to 1946. This meant he was in charge of the Labour Party agents nationwide at the landslide election victory which brought Clement Attlee to No. 10. The Member of parliament for Blackburn was the senior Labour Party politician Sir Stafford Cripps, a post war Chancellor of the Exchequer and this position must have been important to his career in The Labour Party. When Sir Winston Churchill requested that Clement Attlee and the Labour Party enter into a wartime coalition, he negotiated the terms of the coalition agreement with George Shepherd.

House of Lords
On 28 June 1946 he was raised to the peerage as Baron Shepherd, of Spalding in the County of Lincoln, becoming one of the few Labour peers in the House of Lords. Shepherd then served in the Labour administration of Clement Attlee as a Lord-in-waiting (government whip) from 1948 to 1949, as Captain of the Yeomen of the Guard (Deputy Chief Whip in the House of Lords) in 1949 and as Captain of the Honourable Corps of Gentlemen-at-Arms (Chief Whip in the House of Lords) from 1949 to 1951. The latter year he was also sworn of the Privy Council.

Personal life
In 1915, he married Ada Newton. She was an active trade unionist and campaigner for women's rights who was supported by the Quaker families of Cadbury, Fry and Rowntree in fighting for a living wage for women. They had a son and a daughter, Margaret who died in 2015.

Lord Shepherd died in December 1954, aged 73, and was succeeded in the barony by his only son Malcolm, who also became a prominent Labour politician and held many of the same offices as George Shepherd.

References

Kidd, Charles, Williamson, David (editors). Debrett's Peerage and Baronetage (1990 edition). New York: St Martin's Press, 1990.

 Obituary of his son Malcolm Shepherd, 2nd Baron Shepherd The Independent 7 April 2001

1881 births
1954 deaths
1
Honourable Corps of Gentlemen at Arms
Labour Party (UK) Baronesses- and Lords-in-Waiting
Labour Party (UK) hereditary peers
Members of the Privy Council of the United Kingdom
Ministers in the Attlee governments, 1945–1951
People from Spalding, Lincolnshire
Barons created by George VI